Chaetocercus is a genus of hummingbirds in the family Trochilidae.

Taxonomy
The genus Chaetocercus was introduced in 1855 by the English zoologist George Robert Gray with the rufous-shafted woodstar as the type species. The name is a combination of the Ancient Greek words khaitē, meaning "hair" and kerkos, meaning "tail".

The genus contains six species:
White-bellied woodstar (Chaetocercus mulsant)
Little woodstar (Chaetocercus bombus)
Gorgeted woodstar (Chaetocercus heliodor)
Santa Marta woodstar (Chaetocercus astreans)
Esmeraldas woodstar (Chaetocercus berlepschi)
Rufous-shafted woodstar (Chaetocercus jourdanii)

All these species, except for the rufous-shafted woodstar, were formerly placed in the genus Acestrura. In 1999 Karl-Ludwig Schuchmann remarked in the Handbook of the Birds of the World that for the species placed in Acestrura: "...no evidence in external morphology justifies treatment in a genus separate from C. jourdani".

References

 
Bird genera
Taxa named by George Robert Gray